Viktoria Wedin is a Swedish Paralympic sport shooter.

Wedin has impaired muscle power and competes in SH2 classification events.

Wedin competed at the Paralympic Games in 1996, 2004, where she won a bronze medal in the Mixed 10 metre air rifle standing SH2 event, and in 2008, where she won a bronze medal in the Mixed 10 metre air rifle prone SH2 event.

References

Year of birth missing (living people)
Living people
Swedish female sport shooters
Paralympic shooters of Sweden
Paralympic rifle shooters
Paralympic bronze medalists for Sweden
Paralympic medalists in shooting
Shooters at the 1996 Summer Paralympics
Shooters at the 2004 Summer Paralympics
Shooters at the 2008 Summer Paralympics
Medalists at the 2004 Summer Paralympics
Medalists at the 2008 Summer Paralympics
21st-century Swedish women